A sabre is a type of sword.

Sabre, Sabres, saber, or SABRE may also refer to:

Weapons and weapon systems
 Sabre (fencing), a sporting sword
 Sabre (tank), a modern British armoured reconnaissance vehicle
 Chinese sabre or dao, a variety of Chinese sword
 HMS Sabre, three ships of the Royal Navy
 North American F-86 Sabre, an American jet fighter aircraft
 North American F-100 Super Sabre, an American supersonic jet fighter aircraft
 SS-20 Saber, NATO designation for the RT-21M Pioneer missile

Fiction
 Sabre (Eclipse Comics), one of the first graphic novels
 Sabre (NX Files), a fictional character in NX Files videos
 Sabre, a fictional electronics company from The Office
 Sabre (The Office), an episode of The Office

 Sabre, the name of Vert Wheeler's car in Hot Wheels Battle Force 5
 Sabre, a vehicle in the Grand Theft Auto video game series
 Sabre (1997), a novel by James Follett

Aircraft and rocket engines
 SABRE (rocket engine) (Synergistic Air-Breathing Rocket Engine), a proposed combined cycle rocket engine
 Arnet Pereyra Sabre II, an ultralight aircraft
 Canadair Sabre, a jet fighter aircraft
 Napier Sabre, a piston aeroengine

Organisations and companies
 SaBRE (Supporting Britain's Reservists and Employers), a UK government campaign
 Sabre Corporation, an American travel technology company which runs an air travel reservations system by the same name
 Sabre Medical (previously called Sabre Safety), a Swedish gas-equipment company
 SABRE Research UK, a UK charity for the scientific evaluation of animal models in medicine
 Society for All British and Irish Road Enthusiasts (SABRE), a website covering the British and Irish road network

Sports teams 
 Buffalo Sabres, NHL hockey team
 Somerset Sabres, the name used by Somerset County Cricket Club in one day competition
 Sheffield Sabres, an English basketball team, from Sheffield, South Yorkshire

Other uses
 Sabre (travel reservation system), a system owned by Sabre Holdings, originally developed by American Airlines
 Sabre (dinghy), a class of sailing dinghy
 Sabres, Landes, a commune in the Landes department in France
 Honda Sabre, a Honda motorcycle
 Sodium-iodide with Active Background REjection, a dark matter detection experiment planned for the Stawell Underground Physics Laboratory
 Sabre squadron, an army combat unit of sub-battalion size

See also 
 Sabre Jet (disambiguation)
 
 Society for American Baseball Research (SABR)
 Saber (disambiguation)
 Ceiba (disambiguation)
 Saba (disambiguation)
 Sable (disambiguation)